Cai Sufen (born 1963) is a Taiwanese novelist, working for the Liberty Times. Her best known books, The Child of Salt Pan and The Olive Tree, describe the life and development of a mother and her daughter. The Olive Tree, after being featured on Long-Si Ho's Book of the Month Club, became a best-seller.

References

1963 births
Living people
Taiwanese women novelists